M14, M-14, or M.14 most often refers to:
 M14 rifle, an American military rifle
 Mk 14 Enhanced Battle Rifle, an American designated marksman rifle based on the M14

M14, M-14, or M.14 may also refer to:

Roads
 Highway M14 (Ukraine)
 M-14 (Michigan highway), a road connecting Ann Arbor and Detroit
 M14 (New York City bus), two New York City Bus routes in Manhattan
 M14 (East London), a Metropolitan Route in East London, South Africa
 M14 (Cape Town), a Metropolitan Route in Cape Town, South Africa
 M14 (Johannesburg), a Metropolitan Route in Johannesburg, South Africa
 M14 (Pretoria), a Metropolitan Route in Pretoria, South Africa
 M14 (Bloemfontein), a Metropolitan Route in Bloemfontein, South Africa
 M14 (Port Elizabeth), a Metropolitan Route in Port Elizabeth, South Africa
 M14 Road (Zambia)

Military
 Directorate 14 or M14, a branch of the Iraqi Intelligence Service

Weapons
 M14 mine, a United States anti-personnel landmine
 AN/M14 incendiary grenade, a United States incendiary grenade
 M-14 (rocket), an artillery rocket for the Russian BM-14 multiple rocket launcher
 M14 Half-track, a self-propelled anti-aircraft gun

Vehicles
 Chery M14, a concept car; See Auto Shanghai
 Macchi M.14, an Italian fighter aircraft of 1918
 Miles M.14 Magister, a 1937 British two-seat monoplane basic trainer aircraft
 Noble M14, a British prototype sports car
 Vedeneyev M14P, a Russian aircraft engine
 Watercat M14-class landing craft, a military ship class

Other uses
 M14 (cell line), a human melanoma cell line
 March 14 Alliance, an Anti-Syrian Lebanese Coalition named after the date of their March 14, 2006 movement 
 Messier 14, a globular cluster in the constellation Ophiuchus
 M14, a size of ISO metric screw thread
 Magic 2014, a Magic: The Gathering expansion set
 Samsung Galaxy M14 5G, an Android-based smartphone by Samsung Electronics